Dieter Kirk Brummer (5 May 1976 – 24 July 2021) was an Australian actor. He was best known for his roles in television soap operas, including playing Shane Parrish in Home and Away from 1992 to 1996 and Troy Miller in Neighbours from 2011 to 2012. He also starred in crime drama Underbelly: The Golden Mile, after having a smaller role in the previous series 
 
Brummer and Home and Away co-star Melissa George, who portrayed his partner and later screen wife Angel Parrish, were promoted as a soap super couple in the early 90s.

Biography
Brummer was born in Sydney, New South Wales, and was of German descent. He began his career starring as Shane Parrish in the television soap opera Home and Away. Brummer was nominated for the Gold Logie and Silver Logie Awards for "Most Popular Actor" for the role of Shane Parrish in 1994, but failed to win. However, he went on to win the "Most Popular Actor" silver Logie Award in 1995 and 1996. In 1993, 1994, and 1995 the role saw Brummer voted as "The Prince of Soap" by Dolly magazine's readers. He was written out by way of his character dying from blood poisoning.

Brummer went on to appear in the hospital drama Medivac, the pay-TV series Shark Bay and had a guest role in The Man from Snowy River in 1996. He also appeared in the 1999 film Tom's Funeral and in The Finder (2001). He had a recurring role in the short-lived soap opera Crash Palace (2001) on FOX8 (Sky One in the UK).

In 2005 he took part in the reality television series Celebrity Circus. His mother told Sydney-based radio station 2Day FM in 2007 that he was working as a window-cleaner between acting roles. The station tried to get an interview with him for a "where are they now?" segment, but was unsuccessful.

In 2009, Brummer joined the cast of  Underbelly, during the second series in Underbelly: A Tale of Two Cities in the minor role of Trevor Haken, a corrupt member of the New South Wales Police Force. In the third series, Underbelly: The Golden Mile, this role was increased to one of the principal cast. In 2011, Brummer joined the cast of Neighbours for seven weeks as Troy Miller. On 2 March 2012, it was announced that Brummer had reprised his role as Troy for another guest stint. In 2014 he joined the cast of Winners & Losers for 5 episodes as Jason Ross.

Death
On 24 July 2021, Brummer was found dead at his home in Glenhaven, Sydney at the age of 45. New South Wales Police Force officers discovered him after responding to a 'concern for welfare' report.

Filmography

Guest appearances

Awards and nominations

For his portrayal of Shane Parrish on Home and Away, Brummer won two Logie Awards for Most Popular Actor in 1995 and 1996. He received nominations for Most Popular New Talent in 1993, and the Gold Logie Award for Most Popular Personality on Australian Television in 1994 and 1996.

References

External links

1976 births
2021 deaths
2021 suicides
20th-century Australian male actors
21st-century Australian male actors
Australian male television actors
Australian people of German descent
Logie Award winners
Male actors from Sydney
Suicides in New South Wales